Cynopotamus is a genus of characin fishes from South America, with 12 currently described species:
 Cynopotamus amazonum (Günther, 1868)
 Cynopotamus argenteus (Valenciennes, 1836)
 Cynopotamus atratoensis (C. H. Eigenmann, 1907)
 Cynopotamus bipunctatus Pellegrin, 1909
 Cynopotamus essequibensis C. H. Eigenmann, 1912
 Cynopotamus gouldingi Menezes, 1987
 Cynopotamus juruenae Menezes, 1987
 Cynopotamus kincaidi (L. P. Schultz, 1950)
 Cynopotamus magdalenae (Steindachner, 1879)
 Cynopotamus tocantinensis Menezes, 1987
 Cynopotamus venezuelae (L. P. Schultz, 1944)
 Cynopotamus xinguano Menezes, 2007

References
 

Characidae
Fish of South America